The King of Schnorrers is Israel Zangwill's 1894 picaresque novel, a collection of amusing tragicomic episodes of schnorring by "Manasseh Bueno Barzillai Azevedo da Costa, thenceforward universally recognised, and hereby handed down to tradition, as the King of Schnorrers", in England on the break of 18th/19th centuries, illustrated by Jewish prints and caricatures of the period.

Literary criticism
The novel describes the exploits of two schnorrers,  Manasseh da Costa, a Sephardi Jew, and his sidekick Yankele ben Itzhok, an Ashkenazi (specifically, a Polish Jew). (The fact that they are from different communities is at the center of the conflict of the plot of Chapter 5 "Showing How the King Dissolved the Mahamad".)

Manasseh deals with the life with his wit and "the truly Hidalgo pride". Manasseh's frequent victim is Joseph Grobstock, a nouveau riche capitalist.

A significant component of Zangwill's humor are the traditions of charity and  mutual responsibility in Jewish communities. Milton Hindus wrote that the Jews did not regard outcasts as failures and assumed social responsibility for them. "Properly exploited by a fertile intelligence like Menasseh’s, this attitude enables the ostensible mendicant to become the actual master in the eleemosynary relationship."

The popularity of the novel at the time prompted the author to write a script for the stage. It was not published and thought to be lost until Edna Nahshon discovered it (with some other Zangwill's originals) and it is now at deposit in the British Library. The play debuted in London in 1925. In was published in 1986 in the volume From the Ghetto to Melting Pot: Israel Zangqill's Jewish Plays: Three Playscripts.

Influence
Bernard Herrmann wrote a musical comedy based on Zangwill's novel in 1968, which ran on Broadway for a short time in 1979. It was revived in 1990s on Los Angeles scenes by Judd Woldin. It was a reworked version of Wodlin's Petticoat Lane, a reworked Zangwill's episode about two lovers from two divided Jewish communities.

References

Further reading
Bernard N. Schilling, The comic spirit : Boccaccio to Thomas Mann : Giovanni Boccaccio, Charles Dickens, Henry Fielding, Israel Zangwill, Thomas Mann, 1965, Chapter "Aristocracy and the king of Schnorrers"

External links
 A reading of Israel Zangwill's historical satire The King of Schnorrers (1894), a public domain LibriVox recording

Wikisource:Page:The Spoils of Poynton (London, William Heinemann, 1897).djvu/306, – quotes from contemporary reviews

1894 British novels
Fictional British Jews
Picaresque novels